The 1944 Maryland Terrapins football team represented the University of Maryland in the 1944 college football season. In their second season under head coach Clarence Spears, the Terrapins compiled a 1–7–1 record (1–1 in conference), finished in sixth place in the Southern Conference, and were outscored by their opponents 170 to 46.

Schedule

References

Maryland
Maryland Terrapins football seasons
Maryland Terrapins football